This article is about the particular significance of the century 1201–1300 to Wales and its people.

Princes of Wales
 Llywelyn the Great (c. 1218–1240)
 Dafydd ap Llywelyn (1240–1246)
 Llywelyn ap Gruffudd (c. 1246–1282)
 Dafydd ap Gruffudd (1282–83)
(Also Madog ap Llywelyn, proclaimed prince during revolt of 1294–95)

Princesses of Wales
 Joan, Lady of Wales (c. 1218–1237)
 Eleanor de Montfort (1278–1282)

Events

1201
 Llywelyn the Great, Prince of Gwynedd, takes Eifionydd and Llŷn from Maredudd ap Cynan on a charge of treachery.
 July – Llywelyn makes a treaty with King John of England.
 Valle Crucis Abbey founded by Madog ap Gruffydd Maelor.
1202
 August – Llywelyn the Great attacks Gwenwynwyn ab Owain of Powys.
1203
 7 November – Geoffrey de Henlaw is consecrated as Bishop of St David's.
1204
 King John of England suspects Ranulf de Blondeville, 6th Earl of Chester, of colluding with the Welsh and has his estates temporarily confiscated.
1205
 probable – Llywelyn the Great marries Joan, illegitimate daughter of King John of England.
1206
 King John gives Skenfrith Castle, Grosmont Castle and White Castle to William de Braose, 4th Lord of Bramber.
 Gerald of Wales makes his fourth visit to Rome.
1208
 March – For failing to intervene in the rebellion of William de Braose, 4th Lord of Bramber, Walter II de Clifford is deprived of his Marcher barony of Clifford by King John of England.
 Gwenwynwyn ab Owain is arrested by King John.  Llywelyn the Great annexes Gwenwynwyn's territory of southern Powys.
1209
 Llywelyn the Great accompanies his father-in-law, King John of England, on campaign against King William I of Scotland.
1210
 Maud de Braose and her son William are captured and imprisoned by King John, first at Windsor Castle and then at Corfe Castle, where they are starved to death.
 Ranulf de Blondeville, 6th Earl of Chester, and Peter des Roches lead an army into Gwynedd.  To impede their progress, Llywelyn destroys his own castle at Deganwy, which Ranulf subsequently rebuilds.
1211
 August – King John of England invades Gwynedd with assistance from other Welsh princes and, at his second attempt, penetrates the heart of Llywelyn the Great's territory.  When Robert of Shrewsbury, Bishop of Bangor, refuses to meet John, Bangor is burned and the bishop is taken prisoner.
1212
 Pope Innocent III releases Llywelyn the Great and other Welsh princes from their oaths of loyalty to King John; Llywelyn re-takes most of Gwynedd.
1213
 Llywelyn the Great takes the castles of Deganwy and Rhuddlan.
1214
 4 December – Llywelyn the Great captures Shrewsbury without resistance.
1215
 15 June – A clause in Magna Carta compels release of Llywelyn the Great's son Gruffydd ap Llywelyn Fawr, held as a hostage.
 21 June – Cadwgan of Llandyfai is consecrated as Bishop of Bangor.
 December – Llywelyn captures the south Wales castles of Carmarthen, Kidwelly, Llanstephan, Cardigan and Cilgerran.
 Reginald de Braose, marries Gwladus Ddu.
1216
 19 October – The death of King John of England and the accession of his son as Henry III relieve political tensions between England and Wales.
 Llywelyn the Great holds a council at Aberdyfi to adjudicate on the territorial claims of the lesser princes of Wales.
1217
 9 October – Gilbert de Clare, 5th Earl of Gloucester, marries Isabel Marshal (on her 17th birthday).
 Hugh de Lacy, 1st Earl of Ulster, completes the rebuilding of the church at Llanthony Priory.
 Reginald de Braose, son-in-law of Llywelyn the Great, goes over to the English; Llywelyn responds by attacking de Braose's lands.  De Braose surrenders Swansea to Llywelyn.
1218
 Treaty of Worcester: Llywelyn the Great makes peace with King Henry III of England, his brother-in-law.
1219
 John de Braose, grandson of William de Braose, 4th Lord of Bramber, marries Marared, daughter of Llywelyn the Great.
1220
 King Henry III of England recognises Dafydd ap Llywelyn as the heir of Llywelyn the Great.
 Hostilities break out between Llywelyn and William Marshal, 2nd Earl of Pembroke.
1221
 Approximate date of the building of Castell y Bere by Llywelyn the Great.
1222
 Llywelyn the Great petitions Pope Honorius II to confirm the succession of his legitimate son, Dafydd ap Llywelyn.
 Elen ferch Llywelyn marries John the Scot, Earl of Chester.
1223
 William Marshal, 2nd Earl of Pembroke, retaliates against Llywelyn the Great, recovering Pembroke.
1226
 Pope Honorius III legitimizes Joan, Lady of Wales, at the request of her husband, Llywelyn the Great.
 Regents of King Henry III of England order William Marshal, 2nd Earl of Pembroke, to surrender the castles of Cardigan and Carmarthen.
1228
 Gilbert de Clare, 5th Earl of Gloucester, leads an army against the Welsh, capturing Morgan Gam.
1229
 King Henry III of England accepts the homage of Dafydd ap Llywelyn for the lands he will inherit from his father, Llywelyn the Great.
1230
 Easter – William de Braose, during a visit to Llywelyn the Great, is found in the bedchamber of Llywelyn's wife Joan.  De Braose is hanged and Joan is placed under house arrest.
 probable – Dafydd ap Llywelyn marries Isabella de Braose, daughter of William de Braose.
 probable – The widowed Gwladus Ddu marries Ralph de Mortimer of Wigmore.
 Hay-on-Wye Castle passes into the hands of the de Bohun family.
1231
 9 February – Anselm le Gras is consecrated as Bishop of St David's.
1232
 Walter III de Clifford marries Margaret, a daughter of Llywelyn the Great.
1233
 Walter III de Clifford, with a force of 200 men, defends Bronllys Castle against his father-in-law, Llywelyn the Great.
1234
 January – Llywelyn the Great, in alliance with Richard Marshal, 3rd Earl of Pembroke, takes Shrewsbury.
 21 June – Peace of Middle ends hostilities between Llywelyn the Great and the English Crown.
 Gilbert Marshal, 4th Earl of Pembroke, begins enlarging and further strengthening Pembroke Castle.
1238
 At Strata Florida Abbey, Welsh princes swear fealty to Dafydd ap Llywelyn as heir to Llywelyn the Great.
1240
 11 April – Dafydd ap Llywelyn succeeds his father, Llywelyn the Great, as Prince of Gwynedd and Wales. 
 15 May – the Treaty of Gloucester is signed by Dafydd ap Llywelyn and Henry III.
1241
 17 March – Dafydd sends representatives to Shrewsbury to discuss the ownership of disputed lands as required by the Treaty of Gloucester, though he absents himself. The meeting, and several others, prove fruitless.
 August – King Henry III of England invades Gwynedd.
 29 August – the Treaty of Gwerneigron is signed by Dafydd ap Llywelyn and Henry III. In it, Dafydd agrees to cede most of modern-day Flintshire to Henry. Shortly thereafter, Dafydd hands over his half-brother, Gruffydd ap Llywelyn Fawr, to Henry for imprisonment in the Tower of London.
1244
 1 March – after several years of imprisonment, Gruffudd ap Llywelyn Fawr dies in an escape attempt.  Dafydd ap Llywelyn wages war in the Marches against Henry III.
1245
 March – Dafydd ap Llywelyn recovers much of Flintshire, including Mold Castle.
 August – Henry III of England invades Gwynedd.  After being defeated in battle by Dafydd ap Llywelyn, he proceeds to Deganwy and refortifies the castle there. 
 Autumn – Henry III withdraws to England.
 Following representations from Henry, the Vatican reverses its decision to recognise Dafydd as rightful ruler of Wales.
1246
 25 February – Dafydd ap Llywelyn dies at Abergwyngregyn; he is succeeded by his nephews, Llywelyn ap Gruffudd and Owain ap Gruffudd.
1247
 20 February – An earthquake damages St David's Cathedral.
 April – Llywelyn ap Gruffudd and his brother Owain Goch ap Gruffydd come to terms with King Henry III of England at Woodstock.
 December – Richard de Clare, 6th Earl of Gloucester, keeps a lavish Christmas court at his castle on the Welsh borders.
1252
 July – the earliest known document issued by Dafydd ap Gruffydd is drawn up; in it, he is referred to as 'lord of Cymydmaen'. From this point on Dafydd plays an increasingly important role in Welsh politics.
1255
 June – Llywelyn ap Gruffudd defeats his brothers Dafydd ap Gruffydd and Owain Goch ap Gruffydd at the Battle of Bryn Derwin.
1256
 November – Llywelyn ap Gruffudd crosses the River Conwy to take control of Gwynedd Is Conwy.  With him is his brother Dafydd ap Gruffydd, who has been released from captivity.
1257
 June – A Norman army, sent to reclaim the lands taken from Rhys Fychan by his brother, Maredudd ap Rhys Grug, is defeated by Llywelyn ap Gruffudd at the Battle of Cymerau.
1258
 Llywelyn ap Gruffudd begins using the title "Prince of Wales"; a short-lived Cambro-Scottish treaty is concluded.
1260
 Approximate date of the building of the chapel at Manorbier Castle.
1262
 July – Following his father's death, Richard de Clare, 6th Earl of Gloucester, becomes the ward of Humphrey de Bohun, 2nd Earl of Hereford.
1263
 Dafydd ap Gruffydd enters an alliance with King Edward I of England.
1265
 22 June – Treaty of Pipton establishes an alliance between Llywelyn ap Gruffudd and Simon de Montfort, 6th Earl of Leicester.
1267
 Under the terms of the Treaty of Montgomery, King Henry III of England recognises Llywelyn ap Gruffudd as Prince of Wales.
1268
 Gilbert de Clare, 6th Earl of Hertford, refuses to obey the King's summons to parliament, alleging that, his Welsh estates needed his presence for their defence against Llewelyn ap Gruffudd.
 Work begins on Caerphilly Castle.
1272
 English bishops Godfrey Giffard and Roger de Meyland negotiate with Llywelyn ap Gruffudd.
 Traditional construction date of fortified stone Monnow Bridge at Monmouth.
1274
 Dafydd ap Gruffydd allies himself with King Edward I of England, and conspires with Gruffydd ap Gwenwynwyn to assassinate Dafydd's brother Llywelyn.
1275
 Following her mother's death, Eleanor de Montfort begins her journey to Wales by sea for her marriage with Llywelyn ap Gruffudd. She is captured by "pirates" and taken prisoner by King Edward I of England.
1276
 King Edward I of England declares Llywelyn ap Gruffudd a rebel and marches on Wales.
 Llewelyn seizes Llanrwst, declaring it a "free borough" independent of the diocese of Llanelwy.
1277
 24 June – Humphrey de Bohun, 3rd Earl of Hereford, convenes an army of Marcher lords at Worcester.
 Treaty of Aberconwy is signed by Edward I of England and Llywelyn ap Gruffudd.
 Llywelyn ap Gruffudd releases his elder brother, Owain Goch ap Gruffydd, from captivity.
 Edward I begins construction of castles at Aberystwyth (on a new site), Flint and Rhuddlan, in the latter case involving canalising part of the River Clwyd.
1278
 October – Llywelyn ap Gruffudd is formally married to Eleanor de Montfort at the door of Worcester Cathedral. King Edward I of England attends the ceremony and pays for the celebrations.
1280
 6 October – Thomas Bek is consecrated as Bishop of St David's.
 Neath Fair chartered.
1282
 Palm Sunday – Dafydd ap Gruffudd attacks Hawarden Castle.
 June – an English army is routed at the battle of Llandeilo.
 Autumn – Archbishop John Peckham unsuccessfully attempts to intercede between King Edward I of England and Llywelyn ap Gruffudd.
 7 October – Edward I of England grants the lordship of Bromfield and Yale to John de Warenne, 6th Earl of Surrey, who begins construction of Holt Castle and laying out of a new English town of Holt.
 6 November – An English army attempting to cross the Menai Strait from Anglesey is routed by Welsh forces in the battle of Moel-y-Don. In spite of the setback, English forces continue to make inroads into Gwynedd.
 11 December – Death of Llywelyn ap Gruffudd at the Battle of Orewin Bridge in Cilmeri while making his way south to gather support. Dafydd ap Gruffudd succeeds him as prince.
1283
 18 January – Surrender of Dolwyddelan Castle.
 25 April – Cynfrig ap Madog surrenders Castell y Bere to the English.
 22 June – Dafydd ap Gruffudd is captured by King Edward I of England.
 3 October (2?) – Dafydd ap Gruffudd is executed at Shrewsbury.
 Edward obliges the Cistercians of Aberconwy Abbey to relocate to Maenan Abbey to permit his erection of a castle and walled town at Conwy. He also begins work on the stone-built Caernarfon Castle.
1284
 3 March – King Edward I of England enacts the Statute of Rhuddlan, promulgated on 19 March at Rhuddlan Castle, providing the constitutional basis for the government of the Principality of North Wales.
 August – Edward holds court at Abergwyngregyn.
 Edward holds the first "Round Table" tournament, at Nefyn.
1285
 May – The Cross of Neith, an important religious relic acquired from Wales, is carried through London at the head of a royal procession.
 2 September – Isabella Mortimer, Countess of Arundel, marries, as her third husband, Robert de Hastang.  She is subsequently fined the sum of £1,000 for having married without Royal Licence.
1286 
 Manuscript B of the Annales Cambriae is completed, probably at the Cistercian abbey of Neath.
1287
 8 June – Rhys ap Maredudd revolts in south-west Wales.
1288
 20 January – Rhys ap Maredudd's revolt is finally suppressed as his final stronghold, the castle at Newcastle Emlyn, surrenders.  Rhys goes to ground.
1289
 February – On attaining his majority, Richard FitzAlan is knighted and succeeds to his title of 8th Earl of Arundel.
 Construction work ends on Aberystwyth Castle.
 Harlech Castle is completed by King Edward I of England, at a total cost of £8,190.
1290
 Rebel William Cragh is captured by William de Braose, son of the Lord of Gower.
1294
 30 September – Madog ap Llywelyn begins a revolt against King Edward I of England, claiming the title "Prince of Wales".
 11 November – Madog defeats the forces of the earl of Lincoln in a pitched battle near Denbigh.*
 19 December – Madog issues the so-called Penmachno Document, the only surviving document drawn up by him in which he refers to himself as prince.
1295
 5 March – Madog is defeated at the Battle of Maes Moydog.
 July – Madog surrenders.
 Beaumaris Castle on Anglesey begun.
 Roger Mortimer de Chirk builds Chirk Castle.

Books
 Cadwgan of Llandyfai – De modo confitendi

Births
1203
 date unknown – Eva Marshal, noblewoman (d. 1246)
1212
 April – Dafydd ap Llywelyn (probable; died 1246)
1222
 4 August – Richard de Clare, 5th Earl of Hertford (d. 1262)
1224
 date unknown – Maud de Braose, Baroness Mortimer (d. 1301)
 probable – William de Braose, 1st Baron Braose (d. 1291)
1231
 date unknown – Roger Mortimer, 1st Baron Mortimer (d. 1282)
1282
 June – Gwenllian, only child of Llywelyn ap Gruffudd and Eleanor de Montfort (d. 1337)
 7 August – Elizabeth of Rhuddlan, daughter of King Edward I of England (d. 1316)
1287
 25 April – Roger Mortimer, 1st Earl of March (d. 1330)
1291
 25 July – Hawys Gadarn, heiress (d. c. 1353)

Deaths
1201
 25 July – Gruffydd ap Rhys II, Prince of Deheubarth
1203
 May – Dafydd ab Owain Gwynedd, deposed Prince of Gwynedd
1209
 probable – Walter Map, writer
1211
 9 August – William de Braose, 4th Lord of Bramber
 date unknown – Roger de Lacy, Constable of Chester
1212
 date unknown
 Maredudd ap Cynan ab Owain Gwynedd, Welsh prince
 Robert of Shrewsbury, Bishop of Bangor
1214
 19 August – Roger Mortimer of Wigmore, Marcher lord
1215
 17 November – Giles de Braose, Lord of Abergavenny and Bishop of Hereford
1216
 probable – Gwenwynwyn ab Owain, prince of Powys
1217
 14 October – Isabel, Countess of Gloucester, 43?
 date unknown – Richard de Clare, 3rd Earl of Hertford, Marcher lord
1218
 12 November – Henry de Abergavenny, Bishop of Llandaff
1219
 14 May – William Marshal, 1st Earl of Pembroke
1220
 date unknown
 Henry de Bohun, 1st Earl of Hereford
 Isabel de Clare, 4th Countess of Pembroke
1221
 17 January – Walter II de Clifford, Marcher lord
1223
 probable – Gerald of Wales, chronicler
1228
 June – Reginald de Braose
1229
 10 October – Henry de Beaumont, 5th Earl of Warwick, Welsh landowner
1230
 2 May – William de Braose (executed)
 date unknown – Maelgwn ap Rhys, Prince of Deheubarth
1231
 6 April – William Marshal, 2nd Earl of Pembroke
1232
 18 July – John de Braose, Lord of Bramber and Gower
 26 October – Ranulf de Blondeville, 6th Earl of Chester, Marcher lord
1234
 16 April – Richard Marshal, 3rd Earl of Pembroke
 date unknown – Rhys Gryg, Prince of Deheubarth
1236
 date unknown – Madog ap Gruffydd Maelor, founder of Valle Crucis Abbey
1237
 2 February – Joan, wife of Llywelyn the Great
 6 June – John of Scotland, Earl of Huntingdon, son-in-law of Llywelyn the Great
1240
 11 April – Llywelyn the Great, Prince of Wales
1241
 11 April – Cadwgan of Llandyfai, Bishop of Bangor
 date unknown – John Fitzalan, Lord of Oswestry
1244
 1 March – Gruffydd ap Llywelyn Fawr, illegitimate son of Llywelyn the Great (fell to his death in an attempt to escape from the Tower of London)
1245
 5 December – Anselm Marshal, 6th Earl of Pembroke
1246
 25 February – Dafydd ap Llywelyn, Prince of Wales
 6 August – Ralph de Mortimer, Marcher lord
 date unknown – Ednyfed Fychan, seneschal of Llywelyn the Great
1247
 date unknown
 Hywel ab Ednyfed, Bishop of St Asaph
 Odo of Cheriton, Latin author
1251
 date unknown
 Eleanor de Braose, Countess of Hereford
 Gwladus Ddu, daughter of Llywelyn the Great
1253
 date unknown – Elen ferch Llywelyn, daughter of Llywelyn the Great by Joan
1254
 28 March – William de Ferrers, 5th Earl of Derby
1255
 11 July – Thomas Wallensis, Bishop of St David's
1256
 Gruffudd ab Ednyfed, son of Ednyfed Fychan
1267
 October/November – Richard, bishop of Bangor
1268
 17 October – Goronwy ab Ednyfed, seneschal of Gwynedd
1269
 date unknown – Gruffydd II ap Madog, Lord of Dinas Bran
1280
 1 April – Richard de Carew, Bishop of St David's
1282
 19 June – Eleanor de Montfort, Princess of Wales (in childbirth)
 30 October – Roger Mortimer, 1st Baron Mortimer
 11 December – Llywelyn ap Gruffudd, Prince of Wales (killed in battle)
 probable – Gruffudd Bola, Latin author
1283
 3 October – Dafydd ap Gruffydd, Prince of Gwynedd (executed)
 date unknown – Goronwy ap Heilin, seneschal of Wales
1286
 Gruffydd ap Gwenwynwyn, prince of Powys
1289
 Gruffudd Fychan I, prince of Powys Fadog
1292
 Rhys ap Maredudd, lord of Dryslwyn and rebel leader (executed)
1293
 12 May – Thomas Bek, Bishop of St David's
1294
 17 January – Sir Roger de Puleston, Sheriff of Anglesey (lynched by a mob in Caernarfon)
1295
 7 December – Gilbert de Clare, 6th Earl of Hertford
 date unknown – Cynan ap Maredudd, rebel leader
1296
 May – William de Valence, 1st Earl of Pembroke
1297
 21 November – Roger de Mowbray, 1st Baron Mowbray, Norman lord and a leader in the Welsh wars
1298
 31 December – Humphrey de Bohun, 3rd Earl of Hereford
 date unknown – William de Beauchamp, 9th Earl of Warwick, Norman lord and a leader in the Welsh wars
1299
 date unknown – John Giffard, sheriff of Gloucester

References

 
 
The Lordship of Bromfield and Yale